The 1982 Asian Taekwondo Championships were the 5th edition of the Asian Taekwondo Championships, and were held in Singapore from 9 to 11 December, 1982.

Medal summary

Medal table

References

Results

External links
Results Day 1
Results Day 2
Results Day 3

Asian Championships
Asian Taekwondo Championships
Asian Taekwondo Championships
Taekwondo Championships